Pradoxa confirmata is a species of sea snail, a marine gastropod mollusk in the family Muricidae, the murex snails or rock snails.

Distribution
It occurs off the islands of São Tomé and Príncipe.

References

External links
  Houart, R. & Rolán, E. (2012). The genus Pradoxa Fernandes & Rolán, 1993 (Gastropoda: Muricidae) in São Tomé, Príncipe and Annobón. Iberus. 30(1): 1-14.

Muricidae
Fauna of São Tomé and Príncipe
Gastropods described in 1990